Hermantown is a city in Saint Louis County, Minnesota, United States. The population was 10,221 at the 2020 census. A suburb of Duluth, it was at one point the county's only city to grow in population, as much of the area's residential and commercial expansion occurred there. Hermantown is near the tip of Lake Superior.

The eastern part of Hermantown has an appearance typical of a lower-density bedroom community, with large, leafy lots and occasional subdivisions. The car-oriented "Miller Hill area", or Miller Trunk Corridor of Duluth, has sprawled well past the city boundary line into this part of Hermantown. The western part of Hermantown is more rural, reminiscent of the city's past agricultural focus. Hermantown's motto is "The City of Quality Living".

Hermantown's mayor is Wayne Boucher, who won a 2008 election against Susie Stockinger. Boucher ran unopposed for a second term in 2012 and received 4,111 votes; there were 79 write-ins.

History

The first inhabitants of the area were Native Americans. They lived in the area often called in early Duluth references "the land up over the hill."

In 1867, August Kohlts and his friend Lambert "Pat" Acker filed for homesteads in Section 18, Township 50 North, Range 15 West. Both families had emigrated from Prussia. Acker arrived at about age five with his parents and siblings around 1835 and settled in Erie County, New York. He married Emelie Louisa Wilke on January 12, 1850. Kohlts and his wife, Emilie, immigrated in the spring of 1860. The Kohltses and Ackers resided in the town of Tonawanda on the Niagara River for some years with many other German settlers in the area. Citizenship was granted to Kohlts on March 20, 1868. Soon afterward, the Kohlts and Acker families set out from Buffalo, New York, heading west via the Great Lakes for the Hancock, Michigan, area of the Keweenaw Peninsula and its copper mines.

Perhaps lured by the availability of free land under the Homestead Act, the Kohlts family left for Minnesota. The federal census of June 1, 1870, records their presence in the Second Ward of the newly formed city of Duluth, while the Ackers arrived in Duluth in 1871. By January 1872, August Kohlts had established an 82-acre site in the wilderness outside Duluth. He and Acker were the first settlers in the area now known as Hermantown.

In the years that followed, Kohlts and Acker alternated between working in Duluth and clearing land at their rural homesteads on what is now Five Corners Road in Hermantown. They traveled between Duluth and their homesteads on a Native American trail that later became Piedmont Avenue and the Hermantown Road.

Hermantown's population got a boost from a new wave of homesteaders just before World War II. During the Great Depression, the federal government built nearly a hundred "subsistence homestead" projects designed to move people trapped in poverty in the cities to new homes in rural or suburban locations. One of the two Minnesota projects was assigned to Hermantown.

The Jackson Project was completed in 1937. It is one of Hermantown's more interesting features, with a proliferation of "Jackson Homes" on certain roadways. These single-family dwellings were built during the Depression as subsistence homesteads. Many retain their original brick appearance, albeit with additions. Each of the 84 homesteads had a brick veneer farmhouse; half also had a garage-barn combination. The idea was that the family would be able to raise its own food and use the profits from selling any surplus to work off its debt to the government. The units were sold to homesteaders on very liberal terms: the average price for the home and property was $2,687.40 plus interest.

The Jackson Project was one of the later projects built, which was a benefit because the quality of housing improved. Plumbing and electricity were now required in all homes. The homesteaders gave a new profile to what was then Herman Township. Now with 84 homes and families concentrated in one part of the community, the Project marked the start of Hermantown's transition from rural to suburban.

Hermantown was incorporated as a city on December 31, 1975.

The community of Adolph is in Hermantown's southwest corner.

Geography

U.S. Highway 53, State Highway 194 (MN 194), and County Road 13 (Midway Road) are three of Hermantown's main routes. Others include Maple Grove Road, Haines Road, Arrowhead Road, Stebner Road, Morris Thomas Road, Ugstad Road, and Lavaque Road.

Miller Creek flows through Hermantown's northeast corner. Keene Creek flows through the southeast and east of the city. Kingsbury Creek briefly enters the south-central part of the city near Ugstad Road. Merritt Creek briefly enters Hermantown's southeast corner. Rocky Run flows through the northwest and west-central parts of the city.

The Midway River rises in Hermantown and flows generally southwest through the city's central and southwest portions before entering Midway Township. The Midway River flows into the Saint Louis River in Thomson Township near Cloquet.

Seville Road runs east–west along Hermantown's northern boundary with Canosia Township in northwest and north–central Hermantown. Solway Road runs north–south along Hermantown's western boundary line with Solway Township. Saint Louis River Road runs east–west along Hermantown's southern boundary line with Midway Township in southwest Hermantown. Haines Road runs north–south along Hermantown's eastern boundary line with Duluth.

Duluth International Airport is immediately northeast of Hermantown. The Pike Lake Business District of Canosia Township is immediately northwest of the city. The city of Proctor is immediately south of Hermantown. The Bayview Heights neighborhood of Duluth is immediately southeast of the city. The Piedmont Heights and Duluth Heights neighborhoods of Duluth are both immediately east of Hermantown.

Major highways
  U.S. Highway 53
  Minnesota State Highway 194
  Saint Louis County Road 13 – Midway Road

Demographics

2010 census
As of the census of 2010, there were 9,414 people, 3,355 households, and 2,351 families living in the city. The racial makeup of the city was 93.1% White, 2.4% African American, 1.2% Native American, 1.2% Asian, 0.5% from other races, and 1.6% from two or more races. Hispanic or Latino of any race were 2.2% of the population.

There were 3,355 households, of which 33.1% had children under the age of 18 living with them, 58.4% were married couples living together, 7.5% had a female householder with no husband present, 4.2% had a male householder with no wife present, and 29.9% were non-families. 23.5% of all households were made up of individuals, and 12.5% had someone living alone who was 65 years of age or older. The average household size was 2.55 and the average family size was 3.01.

The median age in the city was 40.1 years. 22.6% of residents were under the age of 18; 8.2% were between the ages of 18 and 24; 26.5% were from 25 to 44; 28.9% were from 45 to 64; and 13.9% were 65 years of age or older. The gender makeup of the city was 54.0% male and 46.0% female.

2000 census
As of the census of 2000, there were 7,448 people, 2,726 households, and 2,077 families living in the city. The racial makeup of the city was 97.27% White, 0.36% African American, 0.83% Native American, 0.47% Asian, 0.05% Pacific Islander, 0.11% from other races, and 0.90% from two or more races. Hispanic or Latino of any race were 0.63% of the population. 19.5% were of Norwegian, 15.9% German, 13.2% Swedish, 9.0% Finnish and 6.5% Irish ancestry.

There were 2,726 households, out of which 37.9% had children under the age of 18 living with them, 64.9% were married couples living together, 8.3% had a female householder with no husband present, and 23.8% were non-families. 19.8% of all households were made up of individuals, and 8.6% had someone living alone who was 65 years of age or older.  The average household size was 2.67 and the average family size was 3.08.

In the city, the population was spread out, with 27.1% under the age of 18, 7.1% from 18 to 24, 28.4% from 25 to 44, 23.8% from 45 to 64, and 13.6% who were 65 years of age or older.  The median age was 38 years. For every 100 females, there were 98.0 males.  For every 100 females age 18 and over, there were 92.8 males.

The median income for a household in the city was $49,861, and the median income for a family was $55,632. Males had a median income of $41,152 versus $25,481 for females. The per capita income for the city was $20,993.  About 2.2% of families and 4.1% of the population were below the poverty line, including 4.7% of those under age 18 and 5.0% of those age 65 or over.

Politics

References

External links

 City of Hermantown, MN – Official Website
 Hermantown Schools site
 Hermantown Area Chamber of Commerce site
 Hermantown Star newspaper site

Cities in Minnesota
Cities in St. Louis County, Minnesota